The Tau Beta Pi Association (commonly Tau Beta Pi, or TBP) is the oldest engineering honor society and the second oldest collegiate honor society in the United States.  It honors engineering students in American universities who have shown a history of academic achievement as well as a commitment to personal and professional integrity. Specifically, the association was founded "to mark in a fitting manner those who have conferred honor upon their Alma Mater by distinguished scholarship and exemplary character as students in engineering, or by their attainments as alumni in the field of engineering, and to foster a spirit of liberal culture in engineering colleges".

History
When academic honor society Phi Beta Kappa sought to restrict its membership to students of the liberal arts in the late 19th century, Edward H. Williams Jr., a member of Phi Beta Kappa and head of the mining department at Lehigh University, formulated the idea of an honor society for those studying technical subjects.  Irving Andrew Heikes, the valedictorian of his class at Lehigh, was initiated as the first student member of Tau Beta Pi on June 15, 1885. A statue on Lehigh's campus commemorates this event.

In 1892, a second chapter was established at Michigan State University. Since then, the association has grown to 257 collegiate chapters across the United States and Puerto Rico. Tau Beta Pi was a founding member of the Association of College Honor Societies. The national headquarters of Tau Beta Pi is located in Knoxville, Tennessee on the campus of the University of Tennessee.

Although Tau Beta Pi never discriminated on the basis of race or religion, Tau Beta Pi did make its start as a male-only society. Female engineering students were scholastically eligible for Tau Beta Pi as early as 1902; however, those women were not granted membership. Starting in 1936, TBP awarded a "women's badge" to exceptional female engineering students, and a total of 619 women's badges were awarded until 1969. In 1969, Tau Beta Pi began granting women full membership in the society.

In 1974, the Sigma Tau fraternity merged with Tau Beta Pi. Sigma Tau was an honor society for engineering much like Tau Beta Pi and was founded at the University of Nebraska in 1904. At the time of the merger, Sigma Tau consisted of 34 collegiate chapters and a total membership of 45,000.  The basis of the merger of Tau Beta Pi and Sigma Tau was the conviction that a single, strong honor society would better serve the engineering profession.

Tau Beta Pi awardees are not normally considered for membership in Phi Beta Kappa, and vice versa, owing to differences in the subjects for demonstrating distinction emphasized by each society. The honor they confer is equivalent.

Insignia 
The colors of Tau Beta Pi are seal brown and white, which are the school colors of Lehigh. The official badge, called the Bent, is a watch key in the shape of the bent of a trestle. The trestle is the load-bearing part of the bridge, representing Tau Beta Pi's principle of Integrity and Excellence In Engineering.  Originally, the keys could be used to wind watches. However, because watches have since been fabricated with their own winding mechanisms, modern keys do not have this ability. When using the Bent, members must adhere to strict guidelines regarding the exact dimensions of the trestle in order for the Bent to be a valid representation. The symbols on the Bent at the top and the bottom are an ancient form of Greek letters. The quarterly magazine of Tau Beta Pi is also titled The Bent.

The logo of Tau Beta Pi was revised and approved at the 2019 Convention in Columbus, Ohio. The new logo features the Bent inside a circle, with the words "Tau Beta Pi / The Engineering Honor Society" either to the right or underneath the symbol and is available in either blue or seal brown on a white background. The old logo, which featured a tilted 3D Bent and the words "Tau Beta Pi / The Engineering Honor Society" in a lighter blue color was discontinued in October 2019.

A logo for Pi Day was developed in 2016 and features a black seal with white text "Tau Beta Pi / The Engineering Honor Society / Pi Day" centered around the image of the bent in the middle. The digits of pi wrap around the edge of the seal.

Chapters
As of 2022, there are 257 Tau Beta Pi Collegiate Chapters; 251 are active, 6 are inactive.

Membership 
There is now only one "class" of members in Tau Beta Pi, the former classifications of Member with Distinction, Honorary Member, and Associate Member having been discontinued.  Election to membership in the association is accomplished only by vote of a collegiate chapter, and members' chapter designations are always those of the chapters that elected them. Members' class numerals are those of the years in which they received the engineering degrees on which their eligibility was based, although members with no engineering degree are designated by the year in which they were initiated. Candidates eligible for consideration for election to membership by a collegiate chapter fall into five general categories:

 Undergraduate students. 
 Graduate students. 
 Alumni of the chapter's institution who were eligible as students.
 Alumni of other institutions who were eligible as students.
 Engineers of high attainment in the profession, regardless of college attended, scholastic record, or educational background.

Undergraduate eligibility requirements 
Undergraduate students whose scholarship places them in the top eighth of their engineering class in their next-to-last year or in the top fifth of their engineering class in their last college year are eligible for membership consideration. These scholastically eligible students are further considered on the basis of personal integrity, breadth of interest both inside and outside engineering, adaptability, and unselfish activity. At least 50% of a student's coursework must have been completed by the time of their invitation to the society. Students must be pursuing at least one major within their college's engineering school; for this reason, some Computer Science students may or may not be eligible for membership depending on if Computer Science is counted in the engineering school or the liberal arts school at their respective university, for example. Some chapters may set a scholastic-grade deadline below which candidates are not considered, such deadline being higher than that required as a minimum by the Constitution.
 
Elections and initiations are normally held twice a year, in the fall/winter or spring terms of the chapter's institution.
 
Student electees who are financially unable to meet the initiation-fee obligation may make delayed payment arrangements with their chapters, may borrow from the association's loan fund, or may accept election but postpone initiation for up to five years.

Graduate eligibility requirements 
Engineering graduate students whose scholarship places them in the top fifth of their graduate class and have completed at least 50% of their coursework or whose high-quality work is attested to by a faculty member may be elected to membership.
 
Engineering alumni of a chapter's institution or of another recognized institution whose scholastic record placed them in the top fifth of their class may be elected to membership. Such candidates are usually recommended to the chapter by a member who knows them.
 
In all cases the requisite scholastic attainment makes candidates eligible for membership consideration. They are further considered on the basis of the association's exemplary character requirement.

Eminent engineer eligibility requirements 
Persons who have achieved eminence in engineering may be elected to membership without regard to collegiate records. If they graduated from a recognized engineering college, they must have been engaged in engineering for at least 10 years; if not, they must have practiced engineering for at least 15 years. Such candidates are usually recommended by members who know them. The required degree of eminent achievement is left to the chapters' discretion; and candidates are further considered on the basis of exemplary character.

Historical requirements
Prior to the fall of 1941, Tau Beta Pi's scholastic requirements were that eligible candidates stand in the top eighth of the junior class, but in the top quarter of the senior class. The classes graduating in 1942 were thus the first to be admitted under the higher requirement.

Until 1969, membership in Tau Beta Pi was limited to men, although qualified women were offered an award called the Women's Badge. From its authorization in 1936 until its elimination by the admission of women to membership, 619 Women's Badges were awarded by 98 chapters. Those women later were offered full membership by their chapters after Tau Beta Pi initiated its first female members in 1969.

Membership verification 
Tau Beta Pi membership catalogs were published in 1898, 1911, 1916, 1926, 1932, and 1939. The 1946 Convention authorized discontinuance of them because of the excessive cost and limited usefulness.  Today, membership can be verified online.

Membership benefits 
Tau Beta Pi members gain access to a variety of benefits for life after initiation, including access to applying for $2000 scholarships for rising seniors (about 50% acceptance rate) and $10,000 fellowships for graduate students (about 10% acceptance rate), a private LinkedIn group of alumni, the opportunity to attend the annual national convention (with sponsored travel for voting delegates) and participate in a Tau Beta Pi-only recruiting fair, and graduation stoles and cords for members in good standing during their graduation. Members also receive automatic entry-level advancement of US Gov applicants to GS-7* 4 and member-only lifetime discounts from companies like Geico, Dell, SIRVA Home, PPI for FE/EIT and PE exams, and hotels around the world.

Major activities 
Tau Beta Pi has an active fellowship and scholarship program supported by alumni members and other supporters. Some of the results of these programs are:
 3,629 students have received scholarships for their senior year of engineering study since 1998.
 1,736 students have been given Fellowship stipends exceeding $8,000,000 since 1929.
 1,784 students have borrowed more than $862,000 from the educational loan program since 1932.

MindSET program 
One initiative provided by Tau Beta Pi is the MindSET (Math, Science, Engineering, Technology) K-12 program. This program is designed to foster interest in engineering among elementary, middle, and high school students with classroom and hands-on activities. The goal of MindSET is to have students completing algebra by 8th grade and calculus by 12th grade.

MindSET was first conceived by Dr. Jonathan F. Earle as GatorTRAX, a program run by the Florida Alpha chapter, and is now a national program with more than 50 active projects across the country.

Notable members 
Tau Beta Pi's membership includes some famous figures in engineering and technology, including 19 Nobel laureates:
 Buzz Aldrin, second astronaut to walk on the Moon
 Charles Bachman, computer scientist and database technology pioneer
 John Bardeen, engineer and physicist, two time Nobel prize winner
 Mary Barra, Chair and CEO, General Motors
 Jeff Bezos, Amazon.com founder
 Michael Bloomberg, founder of Bloomberg L.P. and mayor of New York from 2002 to 2013
 Stephen G. Bowen, astronaut
 Wernher von Braun, rocket scientist
 Frank Capra, movie director
 Leon Cordero, former president of Ecuador
 Seymour Cray, supercomputer pioneer
 Francis deSouza, CEO of Illumina
 Donn Eisele, astronaut
 Thomas Francis Farrell, Major General, United States Army
 Ernie Fletcher and Paul E. Patton, former governors of Kentucky
 C. Gordon Fullerton, astronaut
 Fred Haise, astronaut
 John H.L. Hansen, American Speech Technologist
 Lee Iacocca, former Chrysler CEO
 Kelly Johnson (engineer), American systems engineer and aeronautical innovator
 Donald Knuth, computer scientist
 Robert S. Langer, David. H. Koch Institute Professor at the Massachusetts Institute of Technology
 Bernard J. Lechner, TV engineer and LCD inventor
 Curtis Lemay, General, United States Air Force
 Erika Moore Taylor, Biomedical engineer, "Forbes 30 under 30 honoree"
 Linus Pauling, two time Nobel prize winner
 Michael Porter,  Bishop William Lawrence University Professor at Harvard Business School & Notable Strategist
 Dan Reneau, former president of Louisiana Tech University
 Mark Rober science-edutainment YouTuber. 
 Clara Shih, CEO of Hearsay Social
 Tom Scholz, lead guitarist of Boston. 
 Robert S. Singleton, American engineer and scientist
 Abe Silverstein, Architect and Father of the US Space Program
 Virginia Sink chemical engineer and the first woman automotive engineer at Chrysler
 Maryly Van Leer Peck, first woman to be initiated into the association and first female chemical engineer graduate from Vanderbilt University
 Waldo Wegner, college basketball All-American

Seven astronauts who died on Apollo 1, Space Shuttle Challenger, and Space Shuttle Columbia are:
Roger B. Chaffee, Apollo 1, Indiana Alpha 1957
Gus Grissom, Apollo 1, Indiana Alpha 1950
Ed White, Apollo 1, Michigan Gamma 1952
Ellison Onizuka, Challenger, Colorado Beta 1969
Judith Resnik, Challenger, Pennsylvania Gamma 1970
Dick Scobee, Challenger, Arizona Alpha 1965
Rick Husband, Columbia, Texas Beta 1980

See also
List of Tau Beta Pi alumni chapters

References

References

External links 
 
 Biography of Tau Beta Pi founder Prof. Edward H. Williams Jr.
 Association of College Honor Societies: Tau Beta Pi
 Tau Beta Pi chapter list at ACHS
 Tau Beta Pi records at the University of Maryland libraries
 Phi Mu Fraternity records at the University of Maryland libraries. Phi Mu Fraternity was the previous name of Tau Beta Pi. These records date from 1923-1945.

 
Association of College Honor Societies
Engineering honor societies
Lehigh University
Student organizations established in 1885
1885 establishments in Pennsylvania